Ewa Krzyżewska (7 February 1939 – 30 July 2003) was a Polish actress. She appeared in twenty films between 1958 and 1973.

Selected filmography
 Ashes and Diamonds (1958)
 Atomic War Bride (1960)
 All Souls' Day (1962)
 Pharaoh (1966)

References

External links

1939 births
2003 deaths
Polish film actresses
Actresses from Kraków